1993 Uganda Cup was the 19th season of the main Ugandan football Cup.

Overview
The competition was known as the Kakungulu Cup and was won by Kampala City Council FC who beat Dairy Heroes FC 2-1 in the final.  The results are not available for the earlier rounds

Final

Footnotes

External links
 Uganda - List of Cup Finals - RSSSF (Mikael Jönsson, Ian King and Hans Schöggl)

Ugandan Cup
Uganda Cup
Cup